Nico Castel (August 1, 1931 – May 31, 2015), born Naftali Chaim Castel Kalinhoff, was a comprimario tenor and well-known language and diction coach, as well as a prolific translator of libretti and writer of books on singing diction. Although Castel performed throughout Europe, North America and South America, he was best known for his nearly 800 performances at The Metropolitan Opera, where he also served as staff diction coach for three decades.

Biography
Castel was born in Lisbon, Portugal, the "scion of a multigenerational dynasty of Sephardic rabbis" with roots in 15th century Castile. He was raised in Venezuela by multilingual parents and a German nanny and attended a French school in Caracas. After some vocal study in Caracas and then the University of Mainz in Germany, Castel moved to New York City at the age of 16 to pursue a singing career and to study romance languages at Temple University in Philadelphia. In the early 1950s, he served in the United States Army as a translator in Germany.

In 1958, he became the first winner of the "Joy in Singing" award, which launched his career with a recital at The Town Hall in New York City. He began calling himself "Nico Castel" early in his singing career. In June 1958 he made his debut with Santa Fe Opera as Fenton in Verdi's Falstaff. The following month he portrayed Joseph in the world premiere of Carlisle Floyd's Wuthering Heights in Santa Fe. In 1965, he first performed with the New York City Opera as Jacob Glock in The Flaming Angel and performing with that company in numerous roles thereafter. With the Metropolitan Opera in 1970, he debuted as Don Basilio in Mozart's The Marriage of Figaro. Over the next 27 years at the Met, he gave nearly 800 performances and later served for three decades, until his retirement in 2009, as its staff diction coach.

Castel had over 200 operatic roles in his repertoire.  His singing career took him around the world to work with such companies as Palacio de Bellas Artes, Mexico City; Finnish National Opera, Helsinki; New Israeli Opera, Tel Aviv; Opera Metropolitana, Caracas; Teatro Nacional de São Carlos, Lisbon; Spoleto Festival, Spoleto, Italy; Maggio Musicale Fiorentino, Florence; Semper Oper, Dresden; and in the United States, the Opera Company of Philadelphia, Seattle Opera, San Francisco Opera, Chicago Lyric Opera, Ravinia Festival, San Antonio Grand Opera Festival, New Orleans Opera, Baltimore Opera, Miami Opera, Santa Fe Opera, Central City Opera, and St. Louis Opera, among others. On the concert stage, he often included Jewish music in his programs, and he served as a cantor at Scarsdale Synagogue in Westchester County, New York, and Progressive Synagogue in Brooklyn, New York. The New York Times commented: "Reviewers over the years praised Mr. Castel’s rich dramatic characterizations, his sensitive musicianship and, not surprisingly, his impeccable diction."

A polyglot, Castel spoke Portuguese, Ladino, German, French, Spanish, Italian and English with native or near-native fluency. He was an internationally known language and diction coach, writing the book A Singer’s Manual of Spanish Lyric Diction and translating an extensive annotated series of librettos of French, German and Italian operas that show the pronunciation of every word in the operas' original languages using the International Phonetic Alphabet. These libretti "are used by singers, teachers and conservatories throughout North America and Europe." He  was on the faculties of The Juilliard School of Music and Mannes College The New School for Music in New York and Boston University, and was a lecturer, teacher and master class leader at other universities and conservatories around the world. His language and diction classes are taught at Juilliard, Eastman School of Music, Indiana University, New York University, Metropolitan Opera, New York City Opera, Chicago Opera, Pittsburgh Opera, the Opera NUOVA Vocal Intensive Program in Edmonton, Alberta, and American Institute of Musical Studies, Graz, Austria. He and his third wife, Carol Cates Castel, a voice teacher and stage director, taught on the faculty of the Spoleto Vocal Arts Symposium in Spoleto, Italy. They also founded and operated the New York Opera Studio, which trained young singers. Castel annually presented the Nico Castel International Master Singer Competition, which accepted competitors up to age 40.

Among Castel's recordings are Manon (with Beverly Sills, 1970) and The Tales of Hoffmann (with Sills and Norman Treigle, 1972), both conducted by Julius Rudel, and a live performance from the Metropolitan Opera of Ariadne auf Naxos (1988, with Jessye Norman, Tatiana Troyanos, and Kathleen Battle, conducted by James Levine; issued on DVD).

Castel's first wife was Carol Bayard and his second was Nancy Benfield. Both marriages ended in divorce. He died at the age of 83 in New York City, where he lived with his wife, Carol Cates Castel. He had one child (with his second wife), Sasha Castel, who lives in Canberra, Australia.

Publications
 Complete Opera Libretti Translation Series, Marcie Stapp, ed. (Leyerle Publications, Geneseo, New York)
 The Nico Castel Ladino Song Book (Tara Publications, Cedarhust, New York)
 A Singer's Manual of Spanish Lyric Diction (Excalibur Press, New York)

References

Further reading
Hines, Jerome. Great Singers on Great Singing, Doubleday (1982)

External links
Castel's website

NY Times review of a Castel recital
Castel profile and description of some of his publications
Castel's Juilliard School profile
Mannes College The New School for Music

1931 births
2015 deaths
20th-century Sephardi Jews
Portuguese Jews
American operatic tenors
American people of Portuguese-Jewish descent
Venezuelan people of Portuguese descent
Operatic tenors
20th-century American male opera singers